George Furbank (born 17 October 1996) is an English professional rugby union player, currently playing for Premiership Rugby side Northampton Saints.

Early years and education
Born in Huntingdon, Furbank played his first rugby at Huntingdon RFC, where his family had been involved since the 1950s.
From the age of 4 until 16 he was educated at Kimbolton School, where rugby was not played. Furbank played other sports, including cricket where he was a talented batsman and was on the books at Leicestershire until under-16 level.
He joined Bedford School for sixth form, captaining their rugby 1st XV before linking up with Saints' Senior Academy in 2015.

Playing career
In 2016 Furbank played for Saints in the Singha Premiership Rugby Sevens Series campaign, and in 2017 he signed an extended contract with the Midlands side.

Furbank made his Northampton Saints debut in the Anglo Welsh Cup in November 2017 against the Exeter Chiefs. He scored his first senior try, yet was forced off injured with a knee injury.

International
Furbank received his first call up to the senior England squad on 20 January 2020 for the 2020 Six Nations Championship. Furbank was then selected to debut against France in Eddie Jones' starting XV.

References 

1996 births
Living people
England international rugby union players
English rugby union players
Northampton Saints players
People educated at Bedford School
Rugby union players from Huntingdon
Rugby union fullbacks